The Hound of the Baskervilles is a 1939 American gothic mystery film based on the 1902 Sherlock Holmes novel of the same name by Sir Arthur Conan Doyle. Directed by Sidney Lanfield, the film stars Basil Rathbone as Sherlock Holmes and Nigel Bruce as Dr. John Watson. Released by 20th Century Fox, it is the first of fourteen Sherlock Holmes films produced between 1939 and 1946 starring Rathbone and Bruce.

It is among the most well-known cinematic adaptations of the novel, and is often regarded as one of the best. It co-stars Richard Greene as Henry Baskerville (who received top billing, as the studio was unsure of the potential of a film about Sherlock Holmes) and Wendy Barrie as Beryl Stapleton.

The Hound of the Baskervilles is notable as the earliest known Sherlock Holmes film to be set in the Victorian period of the original stories. All known previous Holmes films, up to and including the 1930s British film series starring Arthur Wontner as Holmes, had been updated to a setting contemporaneous with the films' release.

Plot 
Sherlock Holmes and Dr. John H. Watson receive a visit from Dr. James Mortimer, who wishes to consult them before the arrival of Sir Henry Baskerville, the last of the Baskervilles, heir to the Baskerville estate in Devonshire.

Dr Mortimer is anxious about letting Sir Henry go to Baskerville Hall, owing to a supposed family curse. He tells Holmes and Watson the legend of the Hound of the Baskervilles, a demonic dog that first killed Sir Hugo Baskerville several hundred years ago (seen in flashback) and is believed to kill all Baskervilles in the region of Devonshire.

Holmes dismisses it as a fairy-tale, but Mortimer narrates the events of the recent death of his best friend, Sir Charles Baskerville, Sir Henry's uncle. Although he was found dead in his garden without any trace of physical damage, Sir Charles's face was distorted as if he died in utter terror, from heart failure. He alone had noticed footprints at some distance from the body when it was found; they were the paw marks of a gigantic hound.

Holmes decides to send Watson to Baskerville Hall along with Sir Henry, claiming that he is too busy to accompany them himself. Sir Henry quickly develops a romantic interest in Beryl Stapleton, the step-sister of his neighbour Jack Stapleton, a local naturalist. Meanwhile, a homicidal maniac named Selden, escaped from Dartmoor Prison, lurks on the moor.

Holmes eventually makes an appearance, having been hiding in the vicinity for some time making his own investigation. Watson and Sir Henry attend a seance held by Mrs. Mortimer. In a trance, she asks, "What happened that night on the moor, Sir Charles?". The only reply is a lone howl, possibly from a hound. After some clever deception by Holmes, he surmises that the true criminal is Stapleton, a long-lost cousin of the Baskervilles, who hopes to claim their vast fortune himself after removing all other members of the bloodline.

Stapleton kept a huge, half-starved, vicious dog trained to attack individual members of the Baskervilles after prolonged exposure to their scent. However, when the hound is finally sent to kill Sir Henry Baskerville, Holmes and Watson arrive to save him just in time. They kill the hound. Stapleton then traps Holmes down in the hound's underground kennel, and  sends Watson into the moor to meet Holmes. Holmes cuts his way out of the kennel and returns to the house and destroys the poison that Stapleton had just given to the wounded Baskerville. Stapleton pulls a gun and flees. Holmes says ominously, "He won't get very far. I've posted constables along the roads and the only other way is across the Grimpen Mire."

Holmes is praised for his work on the case, and he turns in.

Cast
 Richard Greene as Sir Henry Baskerville
 Basil Rathbone as Sherlock Holmes
 Wendy Barrie as Beryl Stapleton
 Nigel Bruce as Dr John H. Watson
 Lionel Atwill as Dr James Mortimer
 John Carradine as Barryman, butler
 Morton Lowry as John (Jack) Stapleton
 Eily Malyon as Mrs Barryman
 Barlowe Borland as Frankland  
 Beryl Mercer as Mrs Jenifer Mortimer  
 Ralph Forbes as Sir Hugo Baskerville (in flashback sequence) 
 E. E. Clive as Cabby in London
 Lionel Pape as Coroner  
 Nigel De Brulier as Convict (as Nigel de Brulier)  
 Mary Gordon as Mrs Hudson
 Ian Maclaren as Sir Charles

Reception
In a contemporary review, the Monthly Film Bulletin described the film as an "excellent film version of the novel." noting that the film's elements "sustain the suspense until the exciting climax," and that "the atmosphere is extremely well contrived". Basil Rathbone and Nigel Bruce were praised for their roles, while "only Wendy Barrie seems lifeless as Beryl in a cast which is uniformly good."

Awards and honors
American Film Institute recognition
 2001 - AFI's 100 Years...100 Thrills - Nominated
 2003 - AFI's 100 Years...100 Heroes & Villains:
 Sherlock Holmes and Dr. Watson - Nominated Heroes
 2008 - AFI's 10 Top 10 - Nominated Mystery Film

References

External links

 
 
 
 

Films based on The Hound of the Baskervilles
1939 films
1930s historical films
1930s mystery films
American detective films
American historical films
American mystery films
1930s English-language films
American black-and-white films
20th Century Fox films
Films directed by Sidney Lanfield
Films scored by David Raksin
Films set in the 1880s
Films set in London
Sherlock Holmes films
1930s American films
Historical mystery films